Tamás Pető (born 8 June 1974) is a Hungarian football coach and a former player. He is the manager of Veszprém.

Playing career
Pető is a midfielder who was born in Ajka and made his debut in professional football, being part of the FC Veszprém squad in the 1992–93 season. He also played for Győri ETO FC, Videoton FC Fehérvár, Újpest FC and Vasas SC before joining NAC Breda.

Managerial career
Pető was appointed as the caretaker manager of the Nemzeti Bajnokság I club, Videoton FC after the dismissal of Bernard Casoni.

In an interview with former Videoton manager, Bernard Casoni, Pető was criticized due to his inexperience.

Managerial statistics

Notes
 Note 1: as caretaker manager

References

External links

1974 births
Living people
Hungarian footballers
Hungary international footballers
Újpest FC players
NAC Breda players
Eredivisie players
Hungarian expatriate footballers
Expatriate footballers in the Netherlands
Hungarian expatriate sportspeople in the Netherlands
Association football midfielders
Hungarian football managers
Fehérvár FC managers
Nemzeti Bajnokság I managers
People from Ajka
Sportspeople from Veszprém County